Charles Clerke was a royal Navy officer.

Charles Clerke may also refer to:

Charles Clerke (footballer) (1857–1944), English amateur footballer who scored the only goal in the 1879 FA Cup Final
 Charles Carr Clerke (1798–1877), Archdeacon of Oxford

See also
Charles Clarke (disambiguation)